This is a list of the main career statistics of Bulgarian professional tennis player, Grigor Dimitrov. To date, Dimitrov has won eight ATP singles titles including at least one title on each playing surface (hard, clay and grass). Highlights of Dimitrov's career thus far include winning the 2017 Cincinnati Masters 1000 crown, semifinal appearances at the 2014 Wimbledon Championships, 2017 Australian Open, 2019 US Open as well as semifinal appearances in Masters 1000 events (2014 Rome, 2014 Canada, 2016 Cincinnati, 2018 Monte Carlo, 2019 Paris, 2021 Indian Wells and 2022 Monte Carlo). By virtue of winning the 2017 ATP Finals, going an undefeated 5–0, Dimitrov achieved a career high singles ranking of world No. 3 on November 20, 2017.

Career achievements 
Dimitrov began the 2013 season by reaching his first career singles final at the Brisbane International where he lost in straight sets to the defending champion, Andy Murray. During the clay court season, Dimitrov reached his first top-level quarterfinal at the Monte Carlo Rolex Masters where he lost in three sets to the eight-time defending champion, Rafael Nadal in three sets before achieving his first win over a reigning world No. 1 by defeating Novak Djokovic in the second round of the Mutua Madrid Open In October of the same year, Dimitrov won his first ATP singles title at the If Stockholm Open, defeating defending champion David Ferrer in three sets. 

The following year, Dimitrov reached his first grand slam quarterfinal at the Australian Open, where he lost to the world No. 1 Rafael Nadal in four sets after failing to convert on three set points in the third set tie-break which would have given him a two sets to one lead. In March, Dimitrov won the biggest ATP singles title of his career thus far by winning the ATP 500 event in Acapulco, defeating Kevin Anderson in the final in three sets before claiming his first career title on clay in Bucharest the following month after a straight sets victory over the defending champion, Lukáš Rosol in the final. At the Internazionali BNL d'Italia, Dimitrov reached his first ATP Masters 1000 semi-final but lost in straight sets to the defending champion Nadal. In June, Dimitrov saved a championship point against Feliciano López during the final of the Queen's Club Championships to win his third title of the year and first career title on grass. In doing so, Dimitrov has now won at least one title on each playing surface (hard, clay and grass). At the 2014 Wimbledon Championships, Dimitrov upset the third seeded defending champion, Andy Murray in the quarterfinals in straight sets to reach his first grand slam semi-final where he lost in four sets to the top seed and eventual champion, Novak Djokovic. As a result of his performance at this event, Dimitrov entered the top ten of the ATP rankings for the first time in his career, achieving a then career high singles ranking of world No. 9.

The 2017 season was, by far, the most successful of his career.  He won 4 Tour titles (matching the number of Tour titles he won from 2011 through 2016), he won his first Masters 1000 crown, qualified for the 2017 ATP Finals where he went a perfect 5–0 and won the event, amassed earnings of $5,628,512 (previous best was $2,795,409 in 2014), racked up eight top-10 wins (previous best was four in 2014), and finished as the year-end No. 3 ranked player in the world (previous best was No. 11 in 2014).

Performance timelines

Singles
Current through the 2023 Australian Open.

Doubles

Significant finals

Year-end championships

Singles: 1 (1 title)

ATP Masters 1000

Singles: 1 (1 title)

ATP career finals

Singles: 15 (8 titles, 7 runners-up)

Doubles: 1 (1 runner-up)

ATP Challengers &  ITF Futures finals

Singles: 11 (10 titles, 1 runner-up)

Doubles: 5 (3 titles, 2 runner-ups)

National participation

Davis Cup (20 wins, 4 losses)
Grigor Dimitrov debuted for the Bulgaria Davis Cup team in 2008. Since then he has a 16–1 singles record and a 4–3 doubles record (20–4 overall).

   indicates the result of the Davis Cup match followed by the score, date, place of event, the zonal classification and its phase, and the court surface.

ATP Cup (3 wins, 3 losses)

United Cup (1 win, 1 loss)

Hopman Cup (5 wins, 1 loss)

Junior Grand Slam finals

Singles: 2 (2 titles)

Doubles: 1 (1 runner-up)

Best Grand Slam results details

Record against top-10 players

Dimitrov's match record against players who have been ranked in the top 10. Boldface indicates players who are still active.

Top 10 wins

Singles
Dimitrov has a  record against players who were, at the time the match was played, ranked in the top 10.

Doubles

Grand Slam seedings

*

ATP Tour career earnings

* Statistics correct .

Notes

References

External links
 
 
 

Tennis career statistics